Rochester Township is one of seventeen townships in Cedar County, Iowa, USA.  As of the 2000 census, its population was 603.

History
Rochester Township is named after Rochester, New York.

There are 3 cemeteries in the township, Hebron, Rochester and Healy. Township Trustees manage both Rochester and Hebron cemeteries while Healy is privately maintained

Geography
The unincorporated community of Rochester, a census-designated place, is located along the Cedar River north of the center of the township. According to the USGS, the township contains two cemeteries: Healey and Hebron.

References

External links
 US-Counties.com
 City-Data.com

Townships in Cedar County, Iowa
Townships in Iowa